Mickle Trafford railway station was a station on the Birkenhead Joint Railway in Mickle Trafford, Cheshire.

History and operations
The station was open for the use by passengers between 1889 and 1951 when it was closed and was subsequently demolished.  Although all traces of the station have now been removed, the site remains an active operational location, as the Mid-Cheshire Line passenger trains from Manchester via Stockport and Altrincham join the main Chester - Warrington (Bank Quay) - Manchester Piccadilly line at this point and Mickle Trafford signal box remains in use to work the junction between the two routes.

References

Bibliography
 Butt R.V.J, The Directory of Railway Stations, 1995, Patrick Stephens Limited,

Further reading

Disused railway stations in Cheshire
Former Birkenhead Railway stations
Railway stations in Great Britain opened in 1889
Railway stations in Great Britain closed in 1951